EH Aalborg  is a handball club from Aalborg and Nørresundby, Denmark. Currently, EH Aalborg competes in the women's Damehåndboldligaen. The home arena of the club is Nørresundby Idrætscenter.

Kits

Team

Current squad
Squad for the 2022-23 season

Goalkeeper
 1  Margit Weihe Fridmundsdottir  
 16  Johanne Graugaard
LW
 3  Ida-Louise Andersen 
 15  Astrid Lynnerup
RW
 7  Malene Dahlmann
 28  Maiken Skov
Pivots
 4  Cecilie Termansen
 18  Laura Skovhus  
 20  Märta Hedenquist  (c)  

Back players
LB
 2  Emma Aagaard  
 8  Signe Kusk
 10  Sofie Lassen
 14  Andrea Jacobsen
CB
 6  Martine Tveter
 19  Mette Brandt Nielsen
 44  Mille Eisenhardt
RB
 5  Frida Høgaard

Staff

Transfers
Transfers for the 2022-23 season.

Joining
  Peter Jagd (head coach) (from  Skanderborg Håndbold)
  Astrid Lynnerup (LW) (from  Bjerringbro FH)
  Signe Kusk (LB) (from own row)
  Andrea Jacobsen (LB) (from  IFK Kristianstad)
  Martine Tveter (CB) (from  Larvik HK)
  Frida Høgaard (RB) (back from loan at  IK Sävehof)
  Malene Dahlmann (RW) (from  Bjerringbro FH)

Leaving
  Allan Heine (Head Coach)
  Synna Lien (GK) (to  Tertnes HE)
  Laura Askvist (GK) (to  Nøvling IF)
  Rikke Hoffbeck (LW) (to  Skanderborg Håndbold)
  Caroline Højer (LB) (to  Bjerringbro FH)
  Sandra Erlingsdóttir (CB) (to  TuS Metzingen)
  Sofie Hartung Sletskov (CB)
  Njoma Zogaj (CB)
  Anne Brinch Nielsen (RW)
  Mette Klostermann (P) (to  Kroppskultur)

Arena 
Name: Nørresundby Idrætscenter
Capacity: 800
City: Nørresundby, Aalborg
Adresse: Lerumbakken 11, 9400 Nørresundby

Kit manufacturers
 Adidas

References

External links
 EH Aalborg

Aalborg
Aalborg Municipality
2015 establishments in Denmark
Handball clubs established in 2015